This article lists diplomatic missions resident in Sweden. At present, the capital city of Stockholm hosts 108 embassies. Several countries have ambassadors accredited to Sweden, with most being resident in Berlin, Brussels, Copenhagen, or London. This listing excludes honorary consulates.

Diplomatic missions in Stockholm and metropolitan area

Consulates-General in Gothenburg

Accredited embassies 

Berlin:

Brussels:

Copenhagen:

London:

Paris:

Oslo:
 
 
 

Other cities:

Closed missions

See also 
 Foreign relations of Sweden
 List of diplomatic missions of Sweden
 Visa requirements for Swedish citizens

Notes

References

External links 
 Stockholm Diplomatic List

 
Diplomatic
Sweden